National City Lines, Inc. (NCL) was a public transportation company. The company grew out of the Fitzgerald brothers' bus operations, founded in Minnesota, United States in 1920 as a modest local transport company operating two buses. Part of the Fitzgerald's operations were reorganized into a holding company in 1936, and later expanded about 1938 with equity funding from General Motors, Firestone Tire, Standard Oil of California and Phillips Petroleum for the express purpose of acquiring local transit systems throughout the United States in what became known as the General Motors streetcar conspiracy. The company formed a subsidiary, Pacific City Lines in 1937 to purchase streetcar systems in the western United States. National City Lines, and Pacific City Lines were indicted in 1947 on charges of conspiring to acquire control of a number of transit companies, and of forming a transportation monopoly for the purpose of "conspiring to monopolize sales of buses and supplies to companies owned by National City Lines." They were acquitted on the first charge and convicted on the second in 1949.

History
The company has roots back to 1920, when E. Roy Fitzgerald and his brother began operating two buses in Minnesota, transporting miners and schoolchildren. In 1936 the company was organized into a holding company. In 1938, National City Lines wished to purchase transportation systems in cities "where street cars were no longer practicable" and replace them with passenger buses. To fund this expansion the company obtained equity funding from companies seeking to increase sales of commercial buses and supplies, including General Motors, Firestone Tire, Standard Oil of California and Phillips Petroleum.

In 1936, they bought 13 transit companies in Illinois, Oklahoma and Michigan, then in 1937, they replaced streetcars in Butte, Montana and made purchases in Mississippi and Texas. Sometimes these systems were already run down, but not always. Major investment had recently been made with improvements to the streetcars systems in Beaumont, Texas.  The Butte system, while sound, deliberately replaced to lower the load on the overtaxed electric system, which was primarily used for commercial uses, including electrolytic refining of copper and zinc.

In 1938 the company entered into exclusive dealing arrangements and obtained equity funding from companies seeking to increase sales of commercial buses and supplies, including General Motors, Firestone Tire, Standard Oil of California and Phillips Petroleum. The company was indicted in 1947 and was later convicted in the United States District Court for the Northern District of Illinois of conspiring to monopolize the sale of buses and related products to the local transit companies that they controlled.

Over 1938 and 1939 the company made purchases in Alabama, Indiana and Ohio. and by 1939, it owned or controlled 29 local transportation companies in 27 different cities in 10 states.

American City Lines, which had been organized to acquire local transportation systems in the larger metropolitan areas in various parts of the country in 1943 merged with NCL in 1946. By 1947 the company owned or controlled 46 systems in 45 cities in 16 states.

In 1947 National City Lines, with others was indicted in the Federal District Court of Southern California on two counts: 'conspiring to acquire control of a number of transit companies, forming a transportation monopolize' and 'Conspiring to monopolize sales of buses and supplies to companies owned by National City Lines' in what became known as the Great American streetcar scandal (or 'General Motors streetcar conspiracy', 'National City Lines conspiracy').

In 1948, the United States Supreme Court (in United States v. National City Lines Inc.) permitted a change in venue to the Federal District Court in Northern Illinois. National City Lines merged with Pacific City Lines the same year.

In 1949, General Motors, Standard Oil of California, Firestone and others were convicted of conspiring to monopolize the sale of buses and related products to local transit companies controlled by NCL and other companies; they were acquitted of conspiring to monopolize the ownership of these companies.  The verdicts were upheld on appeal in 1951. The corporations involved were fined $5000, their executives $1 apiece.

Operating areas and companies
There is considerable uncertainty and variability amongst sources as to where National City Lines operated.

The 1948 ruling stated that:

"Forty-four cities in sixteen states are included. The states are as widely scattered as California, Florida, Maryland, Michigan, Nebraska, Texas and Washington. The larger local transportation systems include those of Baltimore, St. Louis, Salt Lake City, Los Angeles and Oakland. The largest concentrations of smaller systems are in Illinois, with eleven cities; California with nine (excluding Los Angeles); and Michigan with four. The local operating companies were not named as parties defendant."

This table attempts to bring together the many sources detailing the cities in which, at one time or another, National City Lines owned or controlled transit companies. A star (*) indicates that NCL is understood to have had significant control but not ownership:

Alabama: Mobile, Montgomery
California: Burbank, Eureka, Fresno, Glendale, Los Angeles*, Oakland*, Sacramento, Inglewood, Long Beach, San Jose, Pasadena, Stockton
Florida: Tampa, Jacksonville*
Illinois: Aurora/Elgin, Bloomington, Champaign, Danville, East St. Louis, Decatur, Galesburg, Joliet, Kewanee, LaSalle/Peru, Peoria, Quincy, Rock Island
Indiana: South Bend, Terre Haute
Iowa: Burlington, Davenport, Cedar Rapids, Ottumwa, Sioux City
Maryland: Baltimore*
Michigan: Jackson, Lansing, Kalamazoo, Saginaw, Pontiac
Mississippi: Jackson
Missouri: St. Louis*
Montana: Butte, Great Falls
Nebraska: Lincoln
Ohio: Canton, Portsmouth
Oklahoma: Tulsa
Pennsylvania: Philadelphia*
Texas: Beaumont, El Paso, Houston, Port Arthur, Wichita Falls
Utah: Salt Lake City
Washington: Bellingham, Everett, Spokane
Wisconsin: Oshkosh

Additional information:
In Los Angeles the Los Angeles Railway (Yellow Cars) was controlled by NCL but not Pacific Electric Railway (Red Cars)

Montgomery City Lines and the Montgomery bus boycott 

Montgomery City Lines was the National City Lines subsidiary that operated the municipal transit system for Montgomery, Alabama.

On 1 December 1955, Rosa Parks was arrested for refusing to move to the back of a Montgomery City Lines bus. This led to the Montgomery bus boycott. Montgomery City Lines was placed in the middle of a dispute between Montgomery's black citizenry and Montgomery city laws. In a letter published in the Montgomery Advertiser on December 3, 1955, Montgomery's Transportation Superintendent J. H. Bagley wrote:

After Martin Luther King Jr. and the Montgomery Improvement Association wired a letter to National City Lines on 8 December 1955, the company's vice president, Kenneth E. Totten, traveled to Montgomery the following week.

The boycott lasted for just over a year, and cost the company $750,000 (equivalent to $ million in ). The boycott ended only after the United States Supreme Court affirmed Browder v. Gayle, a ruling that black bus passengers had a right to sit in any publicly available seat.

Later history
National City Lines acquired the trucking company Los Angeles-Seattle Motor Express (LASME) in 1959. In 1968, LASME merged with DC International and T.I.M.E. to form T.I.M.E.-DC. National City Lines sold its transportation management division in 1978.

National City Lines was later acquired by Harold C. Simmons early in 1981.  T.I.M.E.-DC ceased operations in 1988. The company continued as a fully controlled subsidiary of Simmon' Contran operation until December 31, 2007, when it was dissolved.

Notes
See reference section below for source documents relating to these notes and for further references

References
Documents referenced from 'Notes' section

External links
National City Lines, Southern Region records at Georgia State University Libraries

Public transportation in the United States
Bus transportation in the United States
Streetcars in the United States
Transport companies established in 1936
Holding companies established in 1936
1936 establishments in Illinois
American companies established in 1936